Mlandege is an administrative ward in the Iringa Urban district of the Iringa Region of Tanzania. In 2016 the Tanzania National Bureau of Statistics report there were 4,855 people in the ward, from 4,640 in 2012.

Neighborhoods 
The ward has 12 neighborhoods.

 Kalenga Road
 Kota
 Lubida
 Mafuruto
 Makondeko
 Mapinduzi
 Mlambalazi
 Msanya
 Ngeng'ena
 Ngulika
 Nguzo
 Sokoni

References 

Wards of Iringa Region